Friday the 13th Part VII: The New Blood is a 1988 American supernatural slasher film directed by John Carl Buechler and starring Lar Park Lincoln, Kevin Blair, Susan Blu, Terry Kiser, and Kane Hodder in his first appearance as Jason Voorhees, a role he would reprise in three subsequent films. It is a sequel to Friday the 13th Part VI: Jason Lives (1986) and the seventh installment in the Friday the 13th franchise. Set years after the events of the previous film, the plot follows a psychokinetic teenage girl (Lincoln) who unwittingly releases Jason from his tomb at the bottom of Crystal Lake, allowing him to go on another killing spree in the area.

The New Blood was intended to have a higher standard of quality than that of the previous installments, with high-profile directors being considered to helm the project. Paramount Pictures sought a partnership with New Line Cinema to create a crossover film between the Friday the 13th and Nightmare on Elm Street series which would not come to fruition until New Line bought the rights to the franchise, releasing Freddy vs. Jason in 2003. After several failed concepts, screenwriter Daryl Haney suggested an idea akin to "Jason vs. Carrie", in which Jason would battle a teenage girl with psychokinetic abilities.

The film was released on May 13, 1988, to mostly negative reviews from critics, and grossed $19.1 million at the U.S. box office on a budget of $2.8 million. It was followed by Friday the 13th Part VIII: Jason Takes Manhattan one year later.

Plot
After witnessing her alcoholic father physically abusing her mother, a young Tina Shepard attempts to escape the chaos at home and heads out onto Crystal Lake in a boat. When her father follows her in an attempt to stop her, Tina's dormant telekinetic abilities emerge, and she accidentally destroys the dock her father is standing on, causing him to fall into the lake and drown.

Years later, a teenage Tina is still struggling with remorse surrounding her father's death. Her mother, Amanda, takes her to the same lakeside residence as part of her treatment from her psychiatrist, Dr. Crews. He begins a series of experiments (verbal assaults) designed to agitate Tina's mental state, forcing her powers to become more pronounced. In reality, he is only trying to exploit her psychic powers. After a particularly upsetting session with Dr. Crews, Tina runs from the cabin and to the dock thinking about her father's death. While thinking about him, she wishes he would come back. Her powers unwittingly awaken mass murderer Jason Voorhees, who was chained at the bottom of Crystal Lake years ago, and he emerges from the water to commit another killing spree.

Next door to the Shepard residence is a group of teens who are throwing a birthday party for their friend Michael. The group includes Michael's cousin Nick, preppy Russell and his girlfriend Sandra, Ben and his girlfriend Kate, science-fiction writer Eddie, stoner David, perky Robin, shy Maddy, and snobby socialite Melissa. Nick, who has arrived just for the party, becomes attracted to Tina, much to Melissa's chagrin. Melissa attempts to break up Nick and Tina, even going as far as kissing Eddie to make Nick jealous, but her schemes are to no availother than making Eddie feel spurned thereafter. Tina tells Nick about Jason and has a vision of him murdering Michael. Meanwhile, Jason kills Michael and his girlfriend Jane, later murdering another couple camping in the woods as well.

When Tina goes off with Nick to find her mother, Jason proceeds to kill the other teens one by one. Russell and Sandra go to the lake for a swim. While Sandra goes skinny-dipping, Russell is killed with an axe to his face. Sandra discovers his body before she is pulled under the water and drowned. Maddy goes looking for David but finds Russell's body. She runs for help, but Jason attacks her in a nearby barn and kills her with a sickle. Jason then kills Ben by crushing his skull and then Kate by driving a party horn into her eye. Inside the house, Jason stabs David and slices Eddie's neck open. Upstairs, Robin finds David's severed head and is thrown out through a window to her death. When Jason attacks Dr. Crews, he saves himself by using Amanda as a human shield, but Jason eventually kills him with a pole chainsaw. Tina finds her mother's body shortly afterward and uses her powers to electrocute Jason and crash part of the house down onto him. When Nick and Tina try to tell Melissa what happened, she thinks that they are crazy and tries to leave, but Jason kills her with an axe to the face.

Nick tries to fight off Jason, but he is quickly subdued. Tina unleashes her powers, breaking Jason's mask and exposing his disfigured and decomposed face. As the battle rages on, the Shepard lakeside cabin is destroyed by an explosive fire and the attack continues on the dock. Although Tina is unable to kill Jason, she unknowingly summons the spirit of her father, who rises from the lake and drags Jason back down with him into the depths of Crystal Lake, chaining the serial killer once more.

The following morning, Tina and Nick are taken away in an ambulance. Someone finds Jason's broken mask in the wreckage and the screen fades to black as Jason's whispers can be heard in the distance.

Cast

Production

Conception
After the previous installment, Friday the 13th Part VI: Jason Lives, which reintroduced the Jason Voorhees character, Part VII was originally intended to be a crossover film between Jason Voorhees and Freddy Krueger. With each Friday the 13th sequel, the box office profits were diminishing, with the films in the Nightmare on Elm Street series grossing nearly twice the amount of the Friday films. Paramount Pictures proposed the crossover idea to New Line Cinema, the rival company who held the rights to the Elm Street films, with Paramount controlling domestic distribution and New Line controlling international distribution. The idea was abandoned after the two companies failed to come to an agreement, with the concept only coming to fruition after New Line purchased the rights to the Friday the 13th franchise, releasing Freddy vs. Jason in 2003.

One of the concepts for Part VII was conceived by associate producer Barbara Sachs, and was noted as being similar to the plot of Jaws, wherein a corporate land developer covers up the previous Jason Voorhees massacres in order to profitably build condos on Crystal Lake. Executive producer Frank Mancuso Jr. resisted the idea, and screenwriter Daryl Haney stated "There’s always a teenage girl who’s left to battle Jason by herself. What if the girl had telekinetic powers?" Sachs, who considered the "Jason vs. Carrie" concept to be "an interesting idea", wanted the installment to be more respectable than the previous entries in the series. Haney stated that "She wanted it to be unlike any other Friday the 13th movie. She wanted it to win an Academy Award". Several high-profile directors were considered for the job, including Italian filmmaker Federico Fellini.

Development

The film's original working title was Birthday Bash, chosen to conceal its identity as a Friday the 13th film. The entire production of this film was scheduled, completed, and released within seven months. Shooting took place from October to November 1987 in Baldwin County, Alabama, at Byrnes Lake off SR 225, and in nearby Mobile in February of 1988.

This film marks the first of four appearances by Kane Hodder as Jason, the only actor to ever reprise the role. Although C. J. Graham, who had portrayed Jason in Part VI, was initially considered, Hodder was ultimately chosen based on his work in the film Prison, for which The New Blood director, Carl Buechler, had worked on as the special effects make-up artist. In that movie, Hodder filmed a scene in which his character, a prisoner executed in the electric chair, rises from the grave; Hodder himself had suggested to Buechler that he have maggots coming out of his mouth during the scene to heighten the effect of decomposition, and went on to film the sequence with live maggots spilling out of his mouth. Buechler remembered Hodder's commitment to the part when casting The New Blood, and chose Hodder over Graham. Graham expressed disappointment, as he had hoped to reprise the role of Jason and make himself synonymous with the character, as Boris Karloff had with Frankenstein's monster, but ultimately expressed satisfaction with Hodder's portrayal and said that he bore no ill will about not being asked to return. Hodder would go on to make cinematic history for the longest uninterrupted onscreen controlled burn in Hollywood history. For the scene in which Tina causes the furnace to shoot flames at Jason, Hodder was actually set on fire by an apparatus rigged so that the ignition could be captured on film (as opposed to being edited in later with trick photography). Hodder was on fire for a full forty seconds, a record at the time.

Post-production
Though one contemporary critic noted that the film is "nearly devoid of blood and gore by '80s slasher standards," several explicit scenes of gore were cut in order to avoid an X rating. Among these were the murder sequences of Judy, who was originally bashed a against a tree in her sleeping bag six times instead of one; Maddy, who originally had a sickle jammed through her neck; Ben's death, which showed Jason crushing his head into a bloody pulp; Kate's death revealed the gory aftermath of a party horn to her eyeball; Eddie's head hit the floor; a shot of Russell's face splitting open with a large blood spurt; Dan's original death had Jason ripping out his guts; Amanda Shepard's death originally showed Jason stabbing her from behind, with the resulting blade going through her chest and subsequent blood hitting Dr. Crews; Dr. Crews's death showed Jason's tree-trimming saw violently cutting into his stomach, sending a fountain of blood and guts in the air; Melissa's original death had Jason cleaving her head in half with an axe with a close-up of her eyes still wriggling in their sockets. The boxed set DVD release of all of the films and the single deluxe edition have all these scenes available as deleted scenes in rough workprint footage; however, the deluxe edition features more additional footage than the boxed set.

Music

On , BSX records released a limited edition CD of Fred Mollin's Friday the 13th Part VII and VIII scores. A vinyl release of the soundtrack including the complete Fred Mollin cues, along with material by Harry Manfredini was released by Waxwork Records in July 2020 and on CD by La-La Land Records in the United States on October 30, 2020.

Home media
The Deluxe DVD Edition was released September 15, 2009.

Reception

Box office
Friday the 13th Part VII: The New Blood opened on Friday, May 13, 1988 in 1,796 theaters, debuting at number 1 and earning $8.2 million in its opening weekend. Ultimately, the film would go on to gross a total of $19.1 million at the U.S. box office, placing it at number 53 on the list of the year's top earners.

Critical response
Friday the 13th Part VII: The New Blood was not screened in advance for critics. On the review aggregator website Rotten Tomatoes, the film holds an approval rating of 35% based on 26 reviews, with an average rating of 4.6/10. The site's critics consensus reads: "As lumbering and bereft of conscious thought as its unstoppable star, Friday the 13th Part VII - The New Blood finds the franchise in desperate need of the title ingredient." On Metacritic, it has a weighted average score of 13 out of 100, based on nine critics, indicating "overwhelming dislike." Audiences polled by CinemaScore gave the film an average grade of "B" on an A+ to F scale.

Gene Siskel gave the film one star in the Chicago Tribune, citing its weak finale and predictable killings, as well as a perceived misogynistic subtext to the entire Friday the 13th series. Steve Davis's review in The Austin Chronicle, written entirely in verse, characterized the repetitive plotline of the series as tiresome and implausible, with campers repeatedly coming to Crystal Lake despite the repeated slaughter of visitors. He gave it a bomb. Susy Flory of the Santa Clarita Signal wrote: "It's Hollywood's idea of every teenager's dream—a bunch of lovely, nubile young girls, a rustic cabin in the woods, a stash of marijuana, and, gore galore courtesy of a zombie superhuman psycho killer." The Star-Gazettes Amnon Kabatchnik wrote that the film is "geared to appeal to the viewers' baser instincts, horrific moments of graphic mutilation are interwoven with nude-and-sex sequences," adding: "The offbeat Tina is reminiscent of Stephen King's Carrie, but unlike Sissy Spacek, Lar Park Lincoln is unable to flesh out a human dimension. Cult devotees of the series probably won't care."

The film is mentioned in the novels American Psycho by Bret Easton Ellis and The Time Traveler's Wife by Audrey Niffenegger.

References

External links

 
 
 
 
 Film page at the Camp Crystal Lake web site
 Film page at Fridaythe13thfilms.com

1980s supernatural films
Friday Part 7
1988 films
1988 horror films
American sequel films
American slasher films
American supernatural horror films
1980s English-language films
Films about telekinesis
Films directed by John Carl Buechler
Films scored by Harry Manfredini
Films scored by Fred Mollin
Films set in 1990
Films set in 1997
Films set in New Jersey
Films shot in Los Angeles
Films shot in Mobile, Alabama
7
Paramount Pictures films
Patricide in fiction
Supernatural slasher films
Films with screenplays by Daryl Haney
Films about mother–daughter relationships
Mad scientist films
1980s American films